Estrid Brekkan (born 1954) is an Icelandic diplomat and the former Icelandic ambassador to Sweden, Albania and Kuwait.

Career
In 1974, Estrid started working for the Ministry for Foreign Affairs. From 2002 to 2006, she was the Counsellor at the Embassy in Oslo. From 2008 to 2013, she served as Minister Counsellor at the Embassy in Paris and from 2013 until 2015 she was the Director of International Organisations and Human Rights at the Directorate for International and Security Affairs in the Ministry for Foreign Affairs, and Deputy Director General of the Directorate.

In 2015, she was made the Icelandic ambassador to Sweden, Albania and Kuwait. She presented her credentials in Stockholm on 23 September 2015.

Personal life
Estrid is of Icelandic, Danish and Swedish descent. earned a degree in Political Science from University of Maryland University College.

References

Icelandic women ambassadors
Ambassadors of Iceland to Sweden
Ambassadors of Iceland to Albania
Ambassadors of Iceland to Kuwait
University System of Maryland alumni
1954 births
Living people